Matilde Lundorf Skovsen (born 19 January 1999) is a Danish professional footballer who plays as a right back for Danish club HB Køge and the Denmark national team.

Club career
In 2015–16, Lundorf Skovsen spent a season playing with the youth team of Paris Saint-Germain Féminine. She then returned home to Denmark, where she played for VSK Aarhus in the Elite division, from 2016 to the summer of 2019. In July 2019 she signed a one-year professional contract with Brighton & Hove Albion of the English FA Women's Super League.

On 7 July 2020, Lundorf joined Juventus.

International career

Lundorf Skovsen appeared 25 times for the Denmark national under-19 team, including at the 2018 edition of the UEFA Under-19 Championship in Switzerland, as well as 12 international matches for the under-17 national team. She made her debut in November 2018 on Denmark's under-23 national team, where she was substituted in the 58th minute for Emilie Henriksen.

In 2022 she was called up to the senior national team of Denmark.

Honours 
Juventus
 Serie A: 2020–21, 2021–22
 Coppa Italia: 
 Supercoppa Italiana: 2020–21, 2021–22

References

External links
Profile at Danish Football Association 

1999 births
Living people
Danish women's footballers
Women's association football defenders
Footballers from Nottingham
Danish expatriate women's footballers
Danish expatriate sportspeople in England
Expatriate women's footballers in England
Women's Super League players
Paris Saint-Germain Féminine players
Danish expatriate sportspeople in France
Expatriate women's footballers in France
Brighton & Hove Albion W.F.C. players
Juventus F.C. (women) players
Serie A (women's football) players
Expatriate women's footballers in Italy
Danish expatriate sportspeople in Italy
Denmark women's international footballers
Association football defenders
Denmark international footballers